The 2002 German Grand Prix (formally the Grosser Mobil 1 Preis von Deutschland 2002) was a Formula One motor race held on 28 July 2002 at Hockenheimring, Hockenheim, Baden-Württemberg, Germany. It was the twelfth round of the 2002 Formula One season and the 64th German Grand Prix. The 67-lap race was won by Ferrari driver Michael Schumacher after starting from pole position. Juan Pablo Montoya finished second in a Williams with his teammate Ralf Schumacher third.

It was the first Grand Prix to be held at Hockenheimring since the track was redesigned, which had seen the forest sections of the track removed and hence the length of the track shortened.

Qualifying 
Michael Schumacher qualified on pole position in his Ferrari, setting a time of 1:14.389. Alex Yoong did not qualify for the race due to the 107% rule. Both Arrows A23 cars driven by Heinz-Herald Frentzen and Enrique Bernoldi who deliberately failed to qualify for previous round -the French Grand Prix- did qualify for this event in what would ultimately be the last GP weekend for Arrows F1.

Qualifying classification

Race 
Michael Schumacher won the race, with Juan Pablo Montoya in second, and Ralf Schumacher, Montoya's Williams team-mate, in third. Both Arrows cars retired from the race with mechanical problems, and it would prove to be the last race the team would compete in. Financial difficulties resulted in the team missing the remainder of the season, before going into liquidation at the end of the year. Enrique Bernoldi would not race in a Formula One Grand Prix again.

Race classification

Championship standings after the race 
Bold text indicates the World Champion.

Drivers' Championship standings

Constructors' Championship standings

Note: Only the top five positions are included for both sets of standings.

References

German Grand Prix
German Grand Prix
Grand Prix
July 2002 sports events in Europe